Zhannet Zhaboyeva (born 12 July 1997) is a Kazakhstani rhythmic gymnast.

She competed at the 2013 World Rhythmic Gymnastics Championships.

References

Living people
1997 births
Place of birth missing (living people)
21st-century Kazakhstani women